Softball in Ireland is governed by Softball Ireland, itself a member of the International Softball Federation. As of 2021, the Softball Ireland website noted that there were approximately 800 softball players and 40 teams in the country.

History
The year 1982 marked the first softball league in Ireland, the Dublin Softball League. The Irish Softball Association was formed in 1989. It has been in various guises since then, including the Irish Baseball and Softball Association, the Irish Baseball and Softball Federation, back to the Irish Softball Association, and in recent years has been renamed Softball Ireland.  Softball Ireland (SI) is the governing body of softball in Ireland. SI is responsible for the running of tournaments, leagues, development and international competition in both co-ed slowpitch and ladies fastpitch softball.

Domestic competitions

National team
The national team has competed with varied success in recent years.  The main competition being the European Softball Federation CoEd Slowpitch Championship. The event has been dominated by the Great Britain team winning all seven instalments.  The venue for 2011 was Dupnitsa, Bulgaria.  The record number of participants is eight at the 2010 event.

European Club Championship

2007 saw the inaugural European Cup Co-Ed Slowpitch Championship. The event was held in Limeil-Brévannes, France, from 19 September 2007 to 22 September 2007.  There were five teams competing with Dodder Dynamoes representing Ireland.  The London Chromies were crowned champions beating Dodder Dynamoes 10–3 in the Grand Final.  The 2008 Championships, held in Dupnitsa, Bulgaria from 2 to 6 September, were won by Baker Tomkins of Britain beating Dodder Dynamoes 16–11 in the Grand Final.  The 2009 Championship saw an increase in the participants to 7, with the event is again being held in Dupnitsa, Bulgaria from 26 to 29 August. 2009 winners, Dodder Dynamoes, became the first Irish team, club or national, to win an ESF sanctioned championship.  The London Chromies reclaimed the title at the 2010 event held in Ljubljana, Slovenia.

See also
 Baseball in Ireland

References

External links
Irish Softball Association
European Softball Federation

 
Sport in Ireland by sport